This is a comprehensive list of Cole Prize winners affiliated with the Institute for Advanced Study (IAS) in Princeton, New Jersey as current and former faculty members, visiting scholars, and other affiliates. Of the fifty-six mathematicians who have received the Cole Prize as of 2016, thirty-nine  have been affiliated with the IAS at some point in their career.

The Cole Prize is one of two prizes awarded to mathematicians by the American Mathematical Society.

References

Institute for Advanced Study
Awards of the American Mathematical Society